The Office of Response and Restoration (OR&R) is a program office of the National Ocean Service and a natural resource trustee that protects the coastal environment from oil and hazardous material releases and restores damage caused by such releases.

Oil and Chemical Spill Response

The Office of Response and Restoration's (OR&R) interdisciplinary scientific spill team responds to oil and chemical spills and other emergencies, providing critical advice for federal response efforts. Scientists forecast the movement and behavior of spilled oil and chemicals, evaluate the risk to natural resources, recommend appropriate cleanup actions, and initiate natural resource damage assessments. OR&R strengthens the nation's response capabilities by conducting research, monitoring impacted areas, developing software products and technical guidance, and conducting preparedness activities through training and event simulation. OR&R also represents the Department of Commerce on the National Response Team and Regional Response Teams.

Natural Resource Assessment and Restoration
As a natural resource trustee, OR&R works on a cross-NOAA team to protect and restore marine resources threatened by waste sites and oil spills. OR&R scientists and economists work in partnership with federal, state, and local agencies, the public and industry to assess risk and injuries to NOAA trust resources, provide technical advice, and recommend protective cleanup actions. OR&R conducts natural resource damage assessments by assessing environmental and economic injury and plans restoration. The Office works cooperatively with other agencies, responsible parties, and communities to resolve natural resource liability and implement restoration projects. OR&R also develops and tests new approaches for improved and cost-effective cleanup strategies, damage assessment, and restoration.

Pribilof Island Remediation
Since 1999, OR&R has led the restoration and cleanup of the Pribilof Islands, Alaska. With the goal to remove debris and contamination and close landfills left behind from the U.S. government's management of the commercial fur seal harvest (1867 to 1983), OR&R has remediated 93% of the contaminated sites. This effort will enable the transfer of federal lands to local island entities. Throughout this project OR&R has used cutting-edge technologies and techniques for its investigations, remediation, spatial data collection, and data visualization to ensure effective cleanup management and communication with stakeholders.

Marine Debris Cleanup and Prevention
OR&R administers NOAA's Marine Debris Program. The Program was re-established in 2005 and supports domestic and international efforts to prevent, identify, remove, and reduce the occurrence of marine debris. The Program is identifying and evaluating the adverse impacts of marine debris and designing programs to inform industry and the public of the problem and action needed to solve it. The Marine Debris Program is also developing and implementing projects that minimize the amount of debris entering the oceans and providing funding opportunities for other agencies, academia, interest groups, and communities that are also trying to reduce and prevent marine debris.

See also

Ecology
Earth Science
Natural environment
Nature
Conservation Movement
Sustainability
Biodiversity

External links
 Office of Response and Restoration (OR&R)
 National Ocean Service
 NOAA

National Oceanic and Atmospheric Administration
Environmental organizations based in the United States